Peter Lieb (born 1974) is a German military historian who specializes in the history of Nazi Germany and World War II. He held positions at Institute of Contemporary History, Royal Military Academy Sandhurst and Center for Military History and Social Sciences of the Bundeswehr. Widely published in the field, Lieb specializes in the Western theatre of World War II.

Education and career
Lieb holds a PhD from the University of Munich, where he researched the radicalization of warfare in the West in 1944. His dissertation was awarded the Werner Hahlweg Prize in 2006 and published in book form in 2007 as Konventioneller Krieg oder NS-Weltanschauungskrieg? Kriegführung und Partisanenbekämpfung in Frankreich 1943/44 ("Conventional war or Nazi ideological war? Warfare and Anti-partisan fighting in France 1943/44"). Lieb was then a researcher at the Institute of Contemporary History in Munich and the German Historical Institute in Paris. From 2005 to 2015, Lieb was a senior lecturer at the Department of War Studies, Royal Military Academy Sandhurst.

In 2015, Lieb joined the Center for Military History and Social Sciences of the Bundeswehr in Potsdam. He is a member of the Military History Working Group and the German Committee for the History of the Second World War. He also served as an expert witness at a war crimes trial of Josef Scheungraber in Munich in 2009.

Historian of Nazi Germany
In his research, Lieb traces the German occupation policy and warfare in the Western theatre of war. He differentiates between the actions and motivations of the Wehrmacht and the SS. According to Lieb, the latter had led an ideological struggle, while the Wehrmacht was guided by its understanding of military expediency, but at the same time rarely protested against this division of tasks. Lieb's 2007 book, ''Konventioneller Krieg oder NS-Weltanschauungskrieg?, was positively reviewed. Sönke Neitzel praised it as an "exemplary investigation", while Roman Töppel of the Institute of Contemporary History described it as a "work which sets the standard on the history of the war in the West in 1943/44." The historian , on the other hand, found that Lieb had uncritically adopted "the perspective of the sources" and "underestimated the criminal role of the Wehrmacht in France".

Selected works

In German
 Konventioneller Krieg oder NS-Weltanschauungskrieg? Kriegführung und Partisanenbekämpfung in Frankreich 1943/44 (= Quellen und Darstellungen zur Zeitgeschichte, Band 69). R. Oldenbourg Verlag, München 2007, .
 With Christian Hartmann, Johannes Hürter, Dieter Pohl (historian): Der deutsche Krieg im Osten 1941–1944. Facetten einer Grenzüberschreitung (= Quellen und Darstellungen zur Zeitgeschichte, Vol. 76). R. Oldenbourg Verlag, München 2009, .
 With , Georgiy Kasianov, Alekseij Miller, Bogdan Musiał, Vasyl Rasevyc: Die Ukraine. Zwischen Selbstbestimmung und Fremdherrschaft 1917–1922 (= Veröffentlichungen des Ludwig-Boltzmann-Instituts für Kriegsfolgen-Forschung, Sonderband 13). Leykam Buchverlag, Graz 2011, .
 Unternehmen Overlord. Die Invasion in der Normandie und die Befreiung Westeuropas (= Beck'sche Reihe, 6129). Verlag C.H. Beck, Munich 2014, . Federal Agency for Civic Education
Neue Forschungen (= War in History, Vol. 74). Verlag Ferdinand Schöningh, Paderborn 2014, .
 Der Krieg in Nordafrika 1940-1943. Reclam, Ditzingen 2018, .

In English
 Vercors 1944. Resistance in the French Alps. Osprey Publishing, Oxford 2012, .

References

External links

1974 births
Living people
German military historians
Historians of World War II
German male non-fiction writers
21st-century German historians